Sigoghin is a town in the Koudougou Department of Boulkiemdé Province in central Burkina Faso. The town has a population of 13,528.

References

Populated places in the Centre-Ouest Region
Boulkiemdé Province